Blythewood, in Richmond in Madison County, Kentucky, was built circa 1840 and expanded in 1870.  The property, including four contributing buildings, was listed on the National Register of Historic Places in 1989.

It is a two-story, five-bay brick house with brick chimneys.  Its front facade has five bays and is built with a Flemish bond brick pattern;  five-course common bond is used elsewhere.

Its current owners are Carroll and Charlotte Sutton. There is a large private Kentucky Derby party every year.

References

Houses on the National Register of Historic Places in Kentucky
Federal architecture in Kentucky
Greek Revival architecture in Kentucky
Italianate architecture in Kentucky
Houses completed in 1840
National Register of Historic Places in Madison County, Kentucky
Houses in Madison County, Kentucky
1840 establishments in Kentucky